Seiji Kobayashi (小林 誠司, born June 7, 1989) is a Japanese professional baseball catcher for the Yomiuri Giants of Nippon Professional Baseball (NPB).

Career
Kobayashi attended Doshisha University, where he played for the school's baseball team. The Yomiuri Giants selected Kobayashi in the 2013 Nippon Professional Baseball draft.

In 2018, he was selected .

International career
Kobayashi represented the Japan national baseball team in the 2014 MLB Japan All-Star Series, 2015 exhibition games against Europe, 2017 World Baseball Classic, 2019 exhibition games against Mexico and 2019 WBSC Premier12. 

On February 18, 2019, he was selected at the 2019 exhibition games against Mexico.

On October 1, 2019, he was selected at the 2019 WBSC Premier12.

And also, on November 16, 2018, he was selected Yomiuri Giants roster at the 2018 MLB Japan All-Star Series exhibition game against MLB All-Stars.

References

External links

1989 births
Living people
Doshisha University alumni
Japanese baseball players
Nippon Professional Baseball catchers
Yomiuri Giants players
2017 World Baseball Classic players
2019 WBSC Premier12 players